Rurouni Kenshin has nine OSTs, 12-CD box sets, a directors collection, best theme collection, and ten opening and endings total.

Rurouni Kenshin: The Original Soundtrack
 was released on April 1, 1996 as a CD. Music composed by Asakura Noriyuki.

Rurouni Kenshin. Departure. The Original Soundtrack II
 
Second Original Soundtrack of anime Rurouni Kenshin. It was released on October 21, 1996 as a CD.

Rurouni Kenshin. The Original Soundtrack III
 was released on May 21, 1997.

Rurouni Kenshin. The Original Sound Track IV. Let It Burn
 Released February 1, 1998.

Rurouni Kenshin Original Songs I
 was released on August 1, 1996.

Rurouni Kenshin Original Songs II

るろうに剣心〜明治剣客浪漫譚〜SONGS2 was released on July 18, 1998.

References
 http://www.ost-center.fr/recherche.php?mots_cles=kenshin
 http://www.rken.galeon.com/musica.htm

Soundtracks
Rurouni Kenshin
Lists of soundtracks